Rahane is a place in Argyll and Bute, Scotland.

The area contains much Forestry Commission managed stock. 

Villages in Argyll and Bute